Cossaviricota is a phylum of viruses.

Classes
The following classes are recognized:

 Mouviricetes
 Papovaviricetes
 Quintoviricetes

References

Viruses